Fazel Allahi (also Romanized as Faẕel Allahī) is a village in Holunchekan Rural District in the Central District of Qasr-e Qand County, Sistan and Baluchestan Province, Iran. At the 2006 census, its population was 204, in 36 families.

References 

Populated places in Qasr-e Qand County